, nicknamed Kiki, is a Japanese  professional basketball player.  She plays for Japan women's national basketball team. She competed at the 2020 Summer Olympics, winning a silver medal.

Career 
She plays for JX-Eneos Sunflowers of the Women's Japan Basketball League.

References

External links

1995 births
Living people
Basketball players at the 2018 Asian Games
Asian Games bronze medalists for Japan
Asian Games medalists in basketball
Medalists at the 2018 Asian Games
Universiade medalists in basketball
Universiade silver medalists for Japan
Medalists at the 2017 Summer Universiade
Basketball players at the 2020 Summer Olympics
Olympic basketball players of Japan
Olympic medalists in basketball
Olympic silver medalists for Japan
Medalists at the 2020 Summer Olympics
21st-century Japanese people